Gambetta is a surname. Notable people with the surname include:

Beppe Gambetta (b. 1955), Italian musician
Diego Gambetta (b. 1952), Italian sociologist
Gianmarco Gambetta (b. 1991), Peruvian footballer
Léon Gambetta (1838–1882), French statesman
Schubert Gambetta (1920–1991), Uruguayan footballer

Italian-language surnames